Gordon Kaufman may refer to:

 Gordon D. Kaufman (1925–2011), theologian
 Gordon M. Kaufman, professor of statistics

See also 
 Gordon Kaufmann